A.P. Møller og Hustru Chastine Mc-Kinney Møllers Fond til almene Formaal is a Danish foundation which was founded by A.P. Møller in 1953.

The fund supports 
 Danish culture in Southern Jutland north and south of the border
Cooperation and cultural collaboration between Denmark and the Scandinavian countries
 Danish seafarers with support for education, churches, and sailor's homes 
 Danish shipping and industry
Scientific purposes, especially medical science and mainly in new acquisitions
 Charity

Examples of donations 
1983 Development of Amaliehaven
1989 Renovation of Kastellet, Copenhagen
1997 Renovation of Frederik V on Horseback in Amalienborg castle square
2004 Copenhagen Opera House
2011 Inderhavnsbroen between Havnegade in Nyhavn and Grønlandske Handels Plads
2015 Purchase of Middelgrundsfortet for the creation of Ungdomsøen Youth Island by Danish Scout organisations

External links 
 The foundation's webpage

Foundations based in Denmark
Organizations established in 1953
1953 in Denmark